Gha is the fourth consonant of Indic abugidas. In modern Indic scripts, gha is derived from the early "Ashoka" Brahmi letter , which is probably derived from the Aramaic  ("H/X") after having gone through the Gupta letter .

Āryabhaṭa numeration

Aryabhata used Devanagari letters for numbers, very similar to the Greek numerals, even after the invention of Indian numerals.
The values of the different forms of घ are: 
घ  = 4 (४)
घि  = 400 (४००)
घु  = 40,000 (४० ०००)
घृ  = 4,000,000 (४० ०० ०००)
घॢ  = 4 (४०८)
घे  = 4 (४०१०)
घै  = 4 (४०१२)
घो  = 4 (४०१४)
घौ  = 4 (४०१६)

Historic Gha
There are three different general early historic scripts - Brahmi and its variants, Kharoṣṭhī, and Tocharian, the so-called slanting Brahmi. Gha as found in standard Brahmi,  was a simple geometric shape, with variations toward more flowing forms by the Gupta . The Tocharian Gha  did not have an alternate Fremdzeichen form. The third form of gha, in Kharoshthi was probably derived from Aramaic separately from the Brahmi letter.

Brahmi Gha
The Brahmi letter , Gha, is probably derived from the Aramaic Heth , and is thus related to the modern Latin H and Greek Eta. Several identifiable styles of writing the Brahmi Gha can be found, most associated with a specific set of inscriptions from an artifact or diverse records from an historic period. As the earliest and most geometric style of Brahmi, the letters found on the Edicts of Ashoka and other records from around that time are normally the reference form for Brahmi letters, with vowel marks not attested until later forms of Brahmi back-formed to match the geometric writing style.

Tocharian Gha
The Tocharian letter  is derived from the Brahmi , but does not have an alternate Fremdzeichen form.

Kharoṣṭhī Gha
The Kharoṣṭhī letter  is generally accepted as being derived from the Aramaic Heth , and is thus related to H and Eta, in addition to the Brahmi Gha.

Devanagari script

Gha (घ) is the fourth consonant of the Devanagari abugida. It ultimately arose from the Brahmi letter , after having gone through the Gupta letter . Letters that derive from it are the Gujarati letter ઘ and the Modi letter 𑘑.

Devanagari-using Languages
Like all Indic scripts, Devanagari uses vowel marks attached to the base consonant to override the inherent /ə/ vowel:

Conjuncts with घ

Devanagari exhibits conjunct ligatures, as is common in Indic scripts. In modern Devanagari texts, most conjuncts are formed by reducing the letter shape to fit tightly to the following letter, usually by dropping a character's vertical stem, sometimes referred to as a "half form". Some conjunct clusters are always represented by a true ligature, instead of a shape that can be broken into constituent independent letters. Vertically stacked conjuncts are ubiquitous in older texts, while only a few are still used routinely in modern Devanagari texts. The use of ligatures and vertical conjuncts may vary across languages using the Devanagari script, with Marathi in particular preferring the use of half forms where texts in other languages would show ligatures and vertical stacks.

Ligature conjuncts of घ
True ligatures are quite rare in Indic scripts. The most common ligated conjuncts in Devanagari are in the form of a slight mutation to fit in context or as a consistent variant form appended to the adjacent characters. Those variants include Na and the Repha and Rakar forms of Ra. Nepali and Marathi texts use the "eyelash" Ra half form  for an initial "R" instead of repha.
 Repha र্ (r) + घ (ɡʱa) gives the ligature rɡʱa: 

 Eyelash र্ (r) + घ (ɡʱa) gives the ligature rɡʱa:

 घ্ (ɡʱ) + rakar र (ra) gives the ligature ɡʱra:

 घ্ (ɡʱ) + न (na) gives the ligature ɡʱna:

 द্ (d) + घ (ɡʱa) gives the ligature dɡʱa:

Stacked conjuncts of घ
Vertically stacked ligatures are the most common conjunct forms found in Devanagari text. Although the constituent characters may need to be stretched and moved slightly in order to stack neatly, stacked conjuncts can be broken down into recognizable base letters, or a letter and an otherwise standard ligature.
 छ্ (cʰ) + घ (ɡʱa) gives the ligature cʰɡʱa:

 ढ্ (ḍʱ) + घ (ɡʱa) gives the ligature ḍʱɡʱa:

 ड্ (ḍ) + घ (ɡʱa) gives the ligature ḍɡʱa:

 घ্ (ɡʱ) + च (ca) gives the ligature ɡʱca:

 घ্ (ɡʱ) + ड (ḍa) gives the ligature ɡʱḍa:

 घ্ (ɡʱ) + ज (ja) gives the ligature ɡʱja:

 घ্ (ɡʱ) + ज্ (j) + ञ (ña) gives the ligature ɡʱjña:

 घ্ (ɡʱ) + ल (la) gives the ligature ɡʱla:

 घ্ (ɡʱ) + ङ (ŋa) gives the ligature ɡʱŋa:

 घ্ (ɡʱ) + ञ (ña) gives the ligature ɡʱña:

 ङ্ (ŋ) + घ (ɡʱa) gives the ligature ŋɡʱa:

 ट্ (ṭ) + घ (ɡʱa) gives the ligature ṭɡʱa:

 ठ্ (ṭʰ) + घ (ɡʱa) gives the ligature ṭʰɡʱa:

Bengali script
The Bengali script ঘ is derived from the Siddhaṃ , and is marked by a similar horizontal head line, but less geometric shape, than its Devanagari counterpart, घ. The inherent vowel of Bengali consonant letters is /ɔ/, so the bare letter ঘ will sometimes be transliterated as "gho" instead of "gha". Adding okar, the "o" vowel mark, gives a reading of /ɡʱo/.
Like all Indic consonants, ঘ can be modified by marks to indicate another (or no) vowel than its inherent "a".

ঘ in Bengali-using languages
ঘ is used as a basic consonant character in all of the major Bengali script orthographies, including Bengali and Assamese.

Conjuncts with ঘ
Bengali ঘ exhibits conjunct ligatures, as is common in Indic scripts, with both stacked ligatures being common.
 দ্ (d) + ঘ (ɡʱa) gives the ligature dɡʱa:

 ঘ্ (ɡʱ) + ন (na) gives the ligature ɡʱna:

 ঘ্ (ɡʱ) + র (ra) gives the ligature ɡʱra, with the ra phala suffix:

 ঘ্ (ɡʱ) + য (ya) gives the ligature ɡʱya, with the ya phala suffix:

 ঙ্ (ŋ) + ঘ (ɡʱa) gives the ligature ŋɡʱa:

 ঙ্ (ŋ) + ঘ্ (ɡʱ) + র (ra) gives the ligature ŋɡʱra, with the ra phala suffix:

 ঙ্ (ŋ) + ঘ্ (ɡʱ) + য (ya) gives the ligature ŋɡʱya, with the ya phala suffix:

 র্ (r) + ঘ (ɡʱa) gives the ligature rɡʱa, with the repha prefix:

 র্ (r) + ঘ্ (ɡʱ) + য (ya) gives the ligature rɡʱya, with the repha prefix and ya phala suffix:

Gurmukhi script 
Kagaa  (ਘ) is the ninth letter of the Gurmukhi alphabet. Its name is [kʰəkʰːɑ] and pronounced as /kə̀/. To differentiate between consonants, the Punjabi tonal consonant kà is often transliterated in the way of the Hindi voiced aspirate consonants gha although Punjabi does not have this sound. It is derived from the Laṇḍā letter gha, and ultimately from the Brahmi ga. Gurmukhi kagaa does not have a special pairin or addha (reduced) form for making conjuncts, and in modern Punjabi texts do not take a half form or halant to indicate the bare consonant /k/, although Gurmukhi Sanskrit texts may use an explicit halant.

Gujarati Gha

Gha (ઘ) is the fourth consonant of the Gujarati abugida. It is derived from the 16th century Devanagari Gha  with the top bar (shiro rekha) removed, and ultimately from the Brahmi letter . ઘ (Gha) is similar in appearance to ધ (Dha), and care should be taken to avoid confusing the two when reading Gujarati script texts.

Gujarati-using Languages
The Gujarati script is used to write the Gujarati and Kutchi languages. Like all Indic scripts, Gujarati uses vowel marks attached to the base consonant to override the inherent /ə/ vowel:

Conjuncts with ઘ

Gujarati ઘ exhibits conjunct ligatures, much like its parent Devanagari Script. Most Gujarati conjuncts can only be formed by reducing the letter shape to fit tightly to the following letter, usually by dropping a character's vertical stem, sometimes referred to as a "half form". A few conjunct clusters can be represented by a true ligature, instead of a shape that can be broken into constituent independent letters, and vertically stacked conjuncts can also be found in Gujarati, although much less commonly than in Devanagari.
True ligatures are quite rare in Indic scripts. The most common ligated conjuncts in Gujarati are in the form of a slight mutation to fit in context or as a consistent variant form appended to the adjacent characters. Those variants include Na and the Repha and Rakar forms of Ra.
 ર્ (r) + ઘ (ɡʱa) gives the ligature RGha:

 ઘ્ (ɡʱ) + ર (ra) gives the ligature GhRa:

 ઘ્ (ɡʱ) + ન (na) gives the ligature GhNa:

 દ્ (d) + ઘ (ɡʱa) gives the ligature DGha:

Telugu Gha

Gha (ఘ) is a consonant of the Telugu abugida. It ultimately arose from the Brahmi letter . It is closely related to the Kannada letter ಘ. Most Telugu consonants contain a v-shaped headstroke that is related to the horizontal headline found in other Indic scripts, although headstrokes do not connect adjacent letters in Telugu. The headstroke is normally lost when adding vowel matras.
Telugu conjuncts are created by reducing trailing letters to a subjoined form that appears below the initial consonant of the conjunct. Many subjoined forms are created by dropping their headline, with many extending the end of the stroke of the main letter body to form an extended tail reaching up to the right of the preceding consonant. This subjoining of trailing letters to create conjuncts is in contrast to the leading half forms of Devanagari and Bengali letters. Ligature conjuncts are not a feature in Telugu, with the only non-standard construction being an alternate subjoined form of Ṣa (borrowed from Kannada) in the KṢa conjunct.

Malayalam Gha

Gha (ഘ) is a consonant of the Malayalam abugida. It ultimately arose from the Brahmi letter , via the Grantha letter  Gha. Like in other Indic scripts, Malayalam consonants have the inherent vowel "a", and take one of several modifying vowel signs to represent syllables with another vowel or no vowel at all.

Conjuncts of ഘ
As is common in Indic scripts, Malayalam joins letters together to form conjunct consonant clusters. There are several ways in which conjuncts are formed in Malayalam texts: using a post-base form of a trailing consonant placed under the initial consonant of a conjunct, a combined ligature of two or more consonants joined together, a conjoining form that appears as a combining mark on the rest of the conjunct, the use of an explicit candrakkala mark to suppress the inherent "a" vowel, or a special consonant form called a "chillu" letter, representing a bare consonant without the inherent "a" vowel. Texts written with the modern reformed Malayalam orthography, put̪iya lipi, may favor more regular conjunct forms than older texts in paḻaya lipi, due to changes undertaken in the 1970s by the Government of Kerala.
 ഗ് (g) + ഘ (ɡʱa) gives the ligature gɡʱa:

 ഘ് (ɡʱ) + ന (na) gives the ligature ɡʱna:

 ഘ് (ɡʱ) + ര (ra) gives the ligature ɡʱra:

Thai script 
Kho ra-khang (ฆ) is the sixth letter of the Thai alphabet. It falls under the low class of Thai consonants. In IPA, kho ra-khang is pronounced as [kʰ] at the beginning of a syllable and is pronounced as [k̚] at the end of a syllable. The second and third letters of the alphabet, kho khai (ข) and kho khuat (ฃ), are also named kho, however, they all fall under the high class of Thai consonants. The fourth and the fifth letters of the alphabet, kho khwai (ค), kho khon (ฅ), and kho ra-khang (ฆ), are also named kho and fall under the low class of Thai consonants. Unlike many Indic scripts, Thai consonants do not form conjunct ligatures, and use the pinthu—an explicit virama with a dot shape—to indicate bare consonants. In the acrophony of the Thai script, ra-khang (ระฆัง) means ‘bell’. Kho ra-khang corresponds to the Sanskrit character ‘घ’.

Odia Gha

Gha (ଘ) is a consonant of the Odia abugida. It ultimately arose from the Brahmi letter , via the Siddhaṃ letter  Gha. Like in other Indic scripts, Odia consonants have the inherent vowel "a", and take one of several modifying vowel signs to represent syllables with another vowel or no vowel at all.

Conjuncts of ଘ 
As is common in Indic scripts, Odia joins letters together to form conjunct consonant clusters. The most common conjunct formation is achieved by using a small subjoined form of trailing consonants. Most consonants' subjoined forms are identical to the full form, just reduced in size, although a few drop the curved headline or have a subjoined form not directly related to the full form of the consonant. The second type of conjunct formation is through pure ligatures, where the constituent consonants are written together in a single graphic form. This ligature may be recognizable as being a combination of two characters or it can have a conjunct ligature unrelated to its constituent characters.
 ଙ୍ (ŋ) + ଘ (ɡʱa) gives the ligature ŋɡʱa:

 ର୍ (r) + ଘ (ɡʱa) gives the ligature rɡʱa:

 ଘ୍ (ɡʱ) + ର (ra) gives the ligature ɡʱra:

Comparison of Gha
The various Indic scripts are generally related to each other through adaptation and borrowing, and as such the glyphs for cognate letters, including Gha, are related as well.

Character encodings of Gha
Most Indic scripts are encoded in the Unicode Standard, and as such the letter Gha in those scripts can be represented in plain text with unique codepoint. Gha from several modern-use scripts can also be found in legacy encodings, such as ISCII.

See also
 Heth

References

 Kurt Elfering: Die Mathematik des Aryabhata I. Text, Übersetzung aus dem Sanskrit und Kommentar. Wilhelm Fink Verlag, München, 1975, 
 Georges Ifrah: The Universal History of Numbers. From Prehistory to the Invention of the Computer. John Wiley & Sons, New York, 2000, .
 B. L. van der Waerden: Erwachende Wissenschaft. Ägyptische, babylonische und griechische Mathematik. Birkhäuser-Verlag, Basel Stuttgart, 1966, 
 
 
 Conjuncts are identified by IAST transliteration, except aspirated consonants are indicated with a superscript "h" to distinguish from an unaspirated cononant + Ha, and the use of the IPA "ŋ" and "ʃ" instead of the less dinstinctive "ṅ" and "ś".

Indic letters